Dorcadion pantherinum is a species of beetle in the family Cerambycidae. It was described by Jakovlev in 1900.

Subspecies
 Dorcadion pantherinum desertum Danilevsky, 1995
 Dorcadion pantherinum pantherinum Jakovlev, 1900
 Dorcadion pantherinum sabulosum Danilevsky, 1995
 Dorcadion pantherinum shamaevi Danilevsky, 1995

See also 
 Dorcadion

References

pantherinum
Beetles described in 1900